Frederick Brett Russell (25 June 1813, Walworth – 1 November 1869, Ipswich) was an English architect and artist based in Ipswich, Suffolk.

Russell was based at a studio in Berners Street, Ipswich.

He is buried in Old Ipswich Cemetery.

Architectural career
Fredrick was apprenticed to Henry William Inwood.

Artistic career
Frederick spelt his surname with one "l" for his artistic works.

References

1813 births
1869 deaths